This list of Olympic medalists for the Philippines collects in one location all the names of medalists who participated in the Olympics on behalf of the Philippines.

History

The Philippines made its Olympic debut during the 1924 Summer Olympics held in Paris, France with David Nepomuceno as the sole participant, competing in the Men's 100 metres and 200 metres athletic events. In the next Olympic Games at Amsterdam, Netherlands, the commonwealth won its first medal when swimmer Teófilo Yldefonso finished third at the Men's 200 metre breaststroke aquatic event. In the Los Angeles 1932 Olympics, the country was awarded three bronze medals, the most fruitful for the Filipinos until 2020. It was even said that Los Angeles' weather helped the athletes, as it was comparatively the same as that of the Philippines. The country would win another bronze medal at Berlin 1936 courtesy of Miguel White in the Men's 400 metre hurdles athletic event.

After independence from the United States, the country did not win another medal until the 1964 Summer Olympics in Tokyo, Japan, when boxer Anthony Villanueva was beaten at the gold medal bout, thus claiming silver. His father, José Villanueva, was one of the bronze medalists in 1932.

The next Olympic medals for the Philippines come from Boxing, with Leopoldo Serrantes winning bronze at Seoul 1988, Roel Velasco winning another bronze four years later in Barcelona, Spain, and his brother Mansueto "Onyok" Velasco, claiming silver after losing in the gold medal bout in the 1996 Summer Olympics at Atlanta, United States.

After a long medal drought in four Summer Olympics, from 2000 to 2012, the Philippines won another medal at the 2016 Summer Olympics when Hidilyn Diaz finished second at the Women's 53 kg weightlifting at Rio de Janeiro, Brazil. Four years later, Diaz won the country's first ever gold medal in the Olympic Games.

In the Tokyo 2020 Olympics, the  Philippines had its highest medal haul in Olympic history with four, eclipsing the three medals the country won in 1932. Together with Hidilyn Diaz's gold medal finish in the Women's 55 kg weightlifting category, the other athletes finishing with medals are Nesthy Petecio, winning a silver medal in the Women's featherweight boxing finals, Carlo Paalam, also winning a silver medal in the Men's flyweight boxing finals, and
Eumir Marcial, with a bronze medal finish in the Men's middleweight boxing category semifinals.

List of medalists

Summer Olympics 
A total of 12 athletes have won 1 gold medal, 5 silver medals, and 8 bronze medals for the Philippines at the Summer Olympics.  These Olympians are entitled to  government incentives under Republic Act 9064 and Republic Act 10699.

Winter Olympics 
The Philippines has yet to have a medal in the Winter Olympics.

Youth Summer Olympics 
A single medal won by athlete has been credited to the Philippines. This excludes medals won in mixed international team events which are credited to the Mixed-NOCs teams.

Youth Winter Olympics 
The Philippines has yet to have a medal in the Youth Winter Olympics.

Other medalists

Mixed-NOCs medalists
As per the International Olympic Committee, the Philippines has yet to win a medal at the Youth Olympics. Luis Gabriel Moreno who did not officially medal for the Philippines at the 2014 Youth Summer Olympics did win a medal at the Mixed team event along with Chinese archer Li Jiaman which was credited to the Mixed-NOCs team (MIX) rather than the Philippines (PHI) or China (CHN).

Demonstration sports
The following are medalists in official demonstrations sports in the Summer Olympic Games. This excludes the Wushu Tournament Beijing 2008, which was not an official Olympic demonstration sport for the 2008 edition.

Medal tally by sport

Summer Olympics

Youth Summer Olympics

Mixed-NOCs participation

Medal tally by individual

Notes

References
 

Olympic medalists for the Philippines
Philippines at the Olympics
Lists of Olympic medalists